Events from the year 1442 in Ireland.

Incumbent
Lord: Henry VI

Births

Deaths
Gilla Dubh Ó Flaithbheartaigh, Lord of Iar Connacht and Chief of the Name